The 2022 Tampa Bay Bandits season was the first and only season for the Tampa Bay Bandits as a professional American football franchise. They played as charter members of the United States Football League, one of eight teams to compete in the league for the 2022 season. The Bandits technically played as a traveling team (since the entirety of the regular season was played at Protective Stadium and Legion Field in Birmingham, Alabama) and were led by head coach Todd Haley.

Personnel

Final roster
The Bandits, like all other teams, have a 38-man active roster with a 7-man practice squad.

Staff

Schedule
The Bandits' 2022 schedule was announced on March 7. They opened the season against the Pittsburgh Maulers.

Note: Intra-division opponents are in bold text. * mean that they host the game, since all eight teams play at the same stadium

Game summaries

Week 1: at Pittsburgh Maulers

The Bandits started their season against the Pittsburgh Maulers. The Bandits dominated the first half, scoring 17 unanswered points with 2 touchdowns and a 23 yard field goal. On the Bandits first drive of the game, they drove downfield 68 yards to score with a B. J. Emmons 3 yard rushing touchdown. The teams would trade punts until what would be the Bandits last drive of the first quarter saw them drive 54 yards down field and kick a 23 yard field goal to put them up 10-0 at the end of the first. The teams traded punts again until near the end of the second quarter when a short punt by the Maulers put them at the Pittsburgh's 38 yard line. The drive ended when Jordan Ta'amu threw a 3 yard touchdown pass to Jordan Lasley to put the Bandits up 17-0 heading into the half, which would be the only points Tampa would score. The second half saw the Maulers drive 46 yards to hit a 28 yard field goal to put the Bandits at 17-3, which would be the final score.

Week 2: vs New Orleans Breakers

The Bandits faced their division rival New Orleans Breakers. The Breakers struck first on a 79 yard touchdown drive, but the extra point was missed, putting the Bandits down at 0-6. After a Bandits punt, the Breakers marched 65 yards downfield to score another touchdown, converting a 2-point conversion to bring the Bandits down 0-14. The Bandits responded in the second quarter with a 69 yard field goal drive capped off by a 21-yard field goal by Tyler Rausa to bring the Bandits to 3-14. The Breakers responded with a 56 yard touchdown drive to put the Bandits down two scores at 3-21.

In the second half, the Bandits turned it over on downs while the Breakers were unable to score. In the fourth quarter, the Breakers extended to a 3 score lead after a 22 yard field goal. They triumphed more, scoring a touchdown off a Ta'amu interception, putting them at a commanding 3-31 margin. They then made a 30-yard field goal to put them at 3-34 with a little over a minute, which would be the final score.

Week 3: at Houston Gamblers

The Bandits will play against division rival Houston Gamblers.

Standings

Postseason
Bandits did not make it to the playoffs after a lost against the New Orleans Breakers.

References

Tampa Bay
Tampa Bay Bandits
Tampa Bay Bandits (2022)